The 2010–11 Slovenian Hockey League season was the 20th season of the Slovenian Ice Hockey League, the top level of ice hockey in Slovenia. Six teams participated in the league, and Jesenice have won the championship.

First round

Group A

Group B

Play-offs

Final
HDD Olimpija – Jesenice 0–4 (2–3, 1–2, 2–4, 2–4)

3rd place
HK Olimpija  – Triglav Kranj 2–1 (3–5, 6–2, 6–1)

External links
Final results
 

1
Slovenia
Slovenian Ice Hockey League seasons